Project of History of Indian science and civilization (PHISPC) is a project initiated by the Centre for Studies in Civilizations  under the editorship of Professor D. P. Chattopadhyaya in India. The series also contains 20 monographs.

PHISPC is a large-scale literary project funded by the  Ministry of Human Resource Development. The goal of the project is to publish fifty volumes of books and anthologies, thirty of which will be major volumes, and twenty of which are to be monographs. According to the last update on the projects website, seven volumes and eleven monographs have been published, and in the financial year 2001-02, 7-8 more volumes were to be published, as well as one monograph.

Volumes
A project aimed at corroborating the Indian traditions (pertaining to the various branches of sciences) with the extant Archaeological Remains of India (dated members) on completion has now been published in Germany, in September 2010. This work is  entirely Archaeology Based that are in situ and hence - verifiable. The Book also reports about the whereabouts of 150 Palm leaf manuscripts (iron stylus engraved) of great antiquity; AND, also takes the non-Hindu readers into the store houses of Hindu shrines (considered as almanacs in stone) - that are out of bounds for the non-Hindus. "Indian Ancient Sciences"   ; Lap Lambert; Germany.   
The volumes (with many book parts) are divided thus:
Conceptual volumes in two parts on Science, Philosophy and Culture edited by D. P. Chattopadhyaya and Ravinder Kumar
Volume 1. The Dawn and Development of Indian Civilization. 
Part 1. The Dawn of Indian civilization, edited by Govind Chandra Pande
Part 2. Life, thought and culture in India (from c. 600 BC to c. AD 300) edited by Govind Chandra Pande
Part 3. India's interaction with Southeast Asia, edited by Govind Chandra Pande
Part 4. A golden chain of civilization: Indian, Iranian, Semitic, and Hellenic, edited by Govind Chandra Pande
Part 5. Puranas, History and Itihasa edited by Vidya Niwas Mishra
Volume 2. Life, Thought and Culture in India (AD 300 -1100)
Volume 3. Development of Philosophy, Science and Technology in India and Neighbouring Civilizations
Volume 4. Fundamental Indian Ideas in Physics, Chemistry, Life Sciences and Medicine
Volume 5. Agriculture in India
Volume 6. Culture, Language, Literature and Arts
Volume 7. The Rise of New Polity and Life in Villages and Towns
Volume 8. Economic History of India
Volume 9. Colonial Period
Part 1. Medicine in India: Modern Period, by O.P. Jaggi.
Volume 10. Towards Independence
Part 1. Development of Indian philosophy from eighteenth century onwards, by Daya Krishna
Volume 15. Science pre Independence 
Part 4. Edited by Umadas Gupta 2011

A sub-project in the larger project is Consciousness Science, Society, Value, and Yoga (CONSSAVY) with five planned volumes (each with several books):
Volume 1. Levels of Reality
Volume 2. Theories of Natural and Life Sciences
Volume 3. Natural and Cultural Sciences
Volume 4. Science, Technology, Philosophy and Yoga
Volume 5. Yoga
Volume 6. "tantra Sadhana"

Monographs
The Monograph series of PHISPC has 20 planned volumes on different aspects of science, philosophy, and the arts. Thirteen of these volumes have already appeared:
Volume 1. Philosophy and Culture in Historical Perspective edited by D. P. Chattopadhyaya  and Ravinder Kumar
Volume 2. Some Aspects of Indi's Philosophical and Scientific Heritage edited by D. P. Chattopadhyaya  and Ravinder Kumar
Volume 3. Mathematics, Astronomy and Biology in Indian Tradition edited by D. P. Chattopadhyaya  and Ravinder Kumar
Volume 4. Language, Logic and Science in India edited by D. P. Chattopadhyaya  and Ravinder Kumar
Volume 5. Primal Spirituality of the Vedas: Its Renewal and Renaissance by R. Balasubramanian
Volume 6. Interdisciplinary Studies in Science, Technology, Philosophy and Culture edited by D. P. Chattopadhyaya  and Ravinder Kumar
Volume 7. Ancient Yoga and Modern Science by T.R. Anantharaman
Volume 8. Prolegomena to any Future Historiography of Cultures and Civilizations by Daya Krishna
Volume 9. On Rational Historiography by V. Shekhawat
Volume 10. Science and Spirituality: A Quantum Integration edited by Amit Goswami and Maggie Goswami
Volume 11. Kautiliya Arthasastra Revisited by S.N. Metal
Volume 12. Ways of Understanding the Human Past by D. P. Chattopadhyaya 
Volume 13. The Architecture of Knowledge by Subhash Kak

See also 
 History of science and technology in the Indian subcontinent
 History of science and technology in India
 List of Indian inventions and discoveries
 Nalanda University
 Timeline of historic inventions
 Timeline of Indian innovation

References

External links
Homepage of PHISPC

Cultural organisations based in India
Monographic series
History of science and technology in India